Hana Říčná (born 20 December 1968 in Brno) is a former artistic gymnast who represented Czechoslovakia at the 1988 Summer Olympics, finishing seventh in the team final and 29th in the all-around final. She won two medals at the World Championships, a silver on beam in 1983 and a bronze on the uneven bars in 1985. Hana competed in the Olomouc Friendship Games, held as an alternative to the 1984 Los Angeles Olympics, which the Soviet Union and eight other socialist states boycotted, where she won a silver medal in the all around and on beam.  She also won a silver medal on beam at the 1985 European Championships. 

Říčná is one of a few female gymnasts to have competed the Comaneci salto on uneven bars.

Říčná moved to the United States in 1994 and is the head coach at Rise Gymnastics in Coventry, Rhode Island. Her son, David Jessen, is an elite gymnast who represented the Czech Republic at the 2016 Summer Olympics.

Eponymous skill 
Říčná has one eponymous skill listed in the Code of Points.

References 

1968 births
Living people
Sportspeople from Brno
Czechoslovak female artistic gymnasts
Olympic gymnasts of Czechoslovakia
Gymnasts at the 1988 Summer Olympics
Medalists at the World Artistic Gymnastics Championships
Originators of elements in artistic gymnastics